Godfrey P. Schmidt (1903 –1998) was an American lawyer involved in anti-Communist and anti-union activities who represented Bella Dodd and worked against Jimmy Hoffa.

Background
Godfrey P. Schmidt was born on July 15, 1903, in the Bronx borough of New York City. He graduated in 1925 from Fordham University with his B.A. and took his law degree in 1930 from that same institution.

Career
On September 9, 1952, Schmidt served as legal counsel to former Communist and Teachers Union official Bella Dodd when she testified before the SISS in Manhattan.

Schmidt was particularly noted for his stance against Jimmy Hoffa.

He served on the board of National Review magazine and was the first candidate for Governor of New York State on the Conservative Party ticket.

Personal life and death

Schmidt lived most of his life in New York City, until the last few years of his life when he lived with his daughter in Virginia.

Godfrey P. Schmidt died on September 27, 1998.

References

1903 births
1998 deaths
Fordham University School of Law alumni
Conservative Party of New York State politicians
Fordham University alumni
National Review people
New York (state) lawyers
People from the Bronx
20th-century American lawyers